Jeremiah Bass (born November 4, 1977 in Racine, Wisconsin) is a retired American soccer player.  He retired in January 2011 after sitting out the 2010 season.

Career

Youth and College 

Bass attended Prairie High School and played college soccer at Marquette University from 1997 until 2000.

Professional 

In 2001, Bass trained with the Minnesota Thunder, spending time in 2002 and 2003 with the team, but never signed a formal contract. In July 2003, he moved to Höllvikens GIF in the Swedish Division 2, but returned to the U.S. later that year, playing amateur soccer in the Minnesota Amateur Soccer League with the Internationals, while working for Ameriprise Financial.

Bass eventually came to the attention of the head coach of the Minnesota Thunder of the USL First Division, and he signed with the Thunder on April 9, 2007. Bass would log 1943 minutes in 24 matches during the season.  In 2008, he would become team captain and finish the season with 2510 minutes on the field, notching three goals.

References

External links 

 Minnesota Thunder bio

1977 births
Living people
American expatriate soccer players
Minnesota Thunder players
USL First Division players
Höllvikens GIF players
Soccer players from Wisconsin
Marquette Golden Eagles men's soccer players
American soccer players
Expatriate footballers in Sweden
Association football midfielders